BNK48: Girls Don't Cry Is a Thai documentary film about the first generation members of the all girl Thai idol group BNK48 from before the band's debut until after it gained fame. This film was directed by Nawapol Thamrongrattanarit, produced by iAM Fillms and Salmon House, and distributed by GDH 559. The film had its media screening event on August 14, 2018, at Paragon Cineplex Siam Paragon Shopping Center And was scheduled to be released generally after two days.

Synopsis 
A documentary film about a Thai idol girl group, BNK48 originally adapting from a Japanese idol girl group, AKB48 open opportunity to ordinary teens to be selected into a controlled system and competitive concept. The concept of the band based on an ordinary, but dedicating character.In each single, only 16 from 26 members are selected to be part of it. So, every girl needs to put all of her effort in practicing and improving herself, also inevitably competing with each other, while trying to maintain their friendship.They soon realize that dedication is not the only key factor and hard work doesn’t always lead to success.

Soundtrack 

 Koisuru Fortune Cookie
 River
 Shonichi

Film release

Cinema 
The documentary film had its media premier at Paragon Cineplex at Siam Paragon on August 14, 2018, and was officially released to the public on August 16 in the same year. The movie earned 3.7 million baht on its opening day and 10.5 million baht in four days. The documentary film closed with a total income of 13.35 million baht.

In addition, this film was also selected to be screened in international film festivals abroad, including

 43rd Pia Film Festival (PFF) at National Film Archive of Japan (England), Japan

Netflix and DVD 
Netflix has licensed the film to be released on March 1, 2019. The DVD produced by Salmon House is available for pre-order at the Pre-DVD girls dont cry fan page.

Awards and nominations

References

External links 

 
 
 
 
GDH 559 films
2018 films
Thai-language films
Thai documentary films
BNK48